The Institute of Architects Bangladesh (IAB) (Bānglādēsh Sthāpāti Institute ) is a professional organization for architects in Bangladesh. Architect Muzharul Islam was its founder president. The IAB works with different government organization & offers education, government advocacy to improve the quality of architecture profession in Bangladesh.

History
The Institute of Architects Bangladesh (IAB) was founded in Dhaka on 25 February 1972. Through a nine-month Liberation War, Bangladesh got its independence from Pakistan on 16 December 1971. Three million of people died, ten million were homeless & thousands of houses were demolished during the war. IAB was formed within 3 months after the war ended to support the development of Bangladesh and help rebuild this war torn country.

Organization

Membership
More than 5,000 licensed architects are members of IAB.

There are three levels of membership in the IAB depending on professional experience.
 Associate Member, AMIAB
 Member, MIAB
 Fellow, FIAB (Member with minimum 20 years experience)

There have another category for students as Student Member.

All Presidents of Institute of Architects Bangladesh
 Architect Muzharul Islam (Late) 
 Architect S.H.M.A Bashar (Late) 
 Architect M.A. Muktadir
 Architect Shah Alam Zahiruddin
 Architect Mahbub Haque
 Architect Rabiul Husain
 Architect Shamsul Wares
 Architect Khadem Ali
 Architect Mubasshar Hussein
 Architect Abu Sayeed M Ahmed
 Architect Kazi Golam Nasir 
 Architect Jalal Ahmed

International affiliations
 UIA    :     Union of International Architects             
 CAA    :     Commonwealth Association of Architects
 ARCASIA:     Architects Regional Council for ASIA      
 SAARCH :     South Asian Association for Regional Cooperation of Architects

See also
 Architecture of Bangladesh
 List of Bangladeshi architects

References

External links
 

Architecture in Bangladesh
Commonwealth Association of Architects
Professional associations based in Bangladesh
Architecture-related professional associations